Fort Severn Airport  is located  northwest of Fort Severn First Nation, Ontario, Canada.

Airlines and destinations

Accidents and incidents
On 25 September 1975, Douglas C-47A CF-AII of Ilford-Riverton Airways crashed short of the runway, killing all three people on board. The aircraft was operating a non-scheduled passenger flight.

References

External links

 Wasaya Airways

Certified airports in Kenora District